The Hyundai Starex is a van built by Hyundai. First-generation models were known in Europe as the Hyundai H-1 and as the Hyundai H200 in the Netherlands. For the second generation, Australian and UK market models are sold as the Hyundai iLoad (cargo version), in Australia as Hyundai iMax and the UK as Hyundai i800 (people mover versions). European models are differentiated as the Hyundai H-1 Cargo (cargo version) and Hyundai H-1 Travel (people mover version). In the Netherlands, it is called Hyundai H300, in Malaysia, only as Hyundai Starex Royale with Minivan, while the people mover version of the H300 is sold only for fleets.

First generation (A1; 1997) 

The Starex succeeded the Hyundai Grace (also known as the H100) in most countries. Like the Hyundai Grace, the first generation A1-series Starex was available in a wide range of configurations, including minivan (MPV), minibus, van, pick-up, taxi and ambulance. These first generation models were initially restricted for sale to the domestic South Korean market, but were eventually exported to a number of countries in Southeast Asia and some parts of Europe.

Available in two trim levels, SVX and Club, and a number of body styles (commercial panel van, and pick up (Libero)). A long wheelbase (12-seater) "Jumbo" and short wheelbase (seven- and nine-seater) "RV" was also available. First introduced to this model are luxurious features like side lower body cladding with two-tone paint scheme (SVX, Club), optional dual sunroof (Club), side body "Tetris style" decals (Club), chrome slant grills, rear tailgate handle opener cover (Club), cream moquette upholstery (Club), optional high-tech head unit with television screen and six-disc CD changer (Club) for domestic models, power windows and antenna (SVX, Club) an Aisin Seiki Co. sourced four-speed automatic transmission with electronically controlled transmission (ECT) and overdrive switch and differently styled "star" 15-inch alloy wheels with exposed lug nuts (Club). For safety, it also features limited-slip differential (LSD), anti-lock braking system (ABS) and driver side airbag. This models was exported to a number countries and proved a big hit to some car markets like the Philippines where at that time was imported via gray market. It gained instant popularity for comfortable sedan-like drive, availability of automatic transmission, expansive interior space and thickly bolstered seats. Its main advantage was being priced lower than its twin, the Mitsubishi Space Gear, yet it packed more features and factory accessories like front bull bars, top basket loader, and a rear ladder. For the following year in the Philippines, the gasoline engine version was dropped due to unusually high gasoline consumption, but still made available for other markets.

This models features updated exterior and interior trims for the SVX and Club models, with features such as multi-reflectorized clear headlamps and jewel-like treatment for the tail-lights, differently styled front bumper over riders, front door "SVX" decals, black and gray interior color scheme with more durable upholstery material, and differently styled alloy wheels for the SVX and Club models.

It retains the previous model's interior and exterior styling features and received a new digital climate control for the higher Club model.

The 2005 to 2007 offered much more with a new front fascia, with features such as squared "bug" eye headlights, an extended bumper to accommodate the oversized square radiator grills with three vertical chrome bars and squared fog lamps. Also new was differently finished rear tail-lights and bumpers, integrated radio antenna, digital odometer and trip meter and (depending on the market) an updated multimedia head unit with flip-down ceiling-mounted screen. The interior features upgraded upholstery, a number of cup holders located at the back seats, and an easy to wipe and clean rubberized floor matting. Top-of-the-line (Gold) models features a leather interior an overhead console and immobilizer. Aluminum accents, split, folding seats, all power features, digital climate control, key less entry and DVD player with six speakers are standard.

The Starex is also produced in China under the name JAC Refine by Anhui Jianghuai Automobile from March 2002 to 2015 under the Hyundai licence. It is very successful, with a market share of about 20 percent. From 2003 to 2008, it has consecutively won "Year's MPV" and "The Best Official Car" from 2004 to 2008. In 2007, it was granted "The Best MPV" and "The Best MPV for Government". The Refine is available with a 2.0-litre turbo or 2.4-litre petrol engine and a 2.8-litre turbo-diesel engine mated to a five-speed manual or four-speed automatic gearbox. 1.8-litre petrol and turbocharged diesel variants along with the 1.9-litre turbo-diesel arrived in 2012, 2013 and 2015 respectively as well as a six-speed manual gearbox for 1.8 and 1.9 litre diesel.

Hyundai Libero 

Between 2000 and 2007, Hyundai manufactured a pickup version of the A1-series Starex. Known as the Hyundai Libero, it was meant to replace the Hyundai Porter in the lineup. They were equipped with a 2.5-liter diesel engine (in normally aspirated and turbocharged forms) or 3.0-liter Sigma gasoline V6, and came in a multiple body styles, including pickup and flatbed. It was sold in The Netherlands as Hyundai H300 Pickup.

Second generation (TQ; 2007)

Powertrain 
The second-generation vehicle was introduced as the Grand Starex with larger dimensions and much stronger CRDi engine.

In 2012, Hyundai updated their diesel engines slightly for the UK and Australian models. Chief among the changes is the addition of a new six-speed manual gearbox in place of the old five-speed unit, improving official fuel economy by 0.5 litres per 100 km to 8.0L/100 km.

This comes at a cost, however, with Hyundai ditching the variable geometry turbocharger from the engine in favour of a less-potent waste gate set-up, resulting in substantially lower power and torque outputs than before.

The new engine/manual gearbox combination will produce official figures of 100 kW and 343Nm, down from 125 kW/392Nm, although the new model hits its peak torque earlier, arriving from a low 1500 rpm.

Five-speed automatic versions of the iLoad diesel get a substantial hike in torque output, with the engine retaining the variable geometry turbocharger but now producing figures of 125 kW and 441Nm (up from 125 kW/392Nm).

The trade-off is a narrower peak torque-band, with the maximum available between a narrow 2000 and 2250 rpm (previously 2000 and 2500 rpm).

Despite the beefy boost, claimed combined fuel consumption has dropped at an even larger rate than the manual, now returning 8.8L/100 km (previously 9.5L/100 km).

Regions 
In the UK, the passenger model is sold as the i800 and is available in two variants, the SE and SE Nav, both available with either manual or automatic transmissions both with the 2.5l CRDi diesel engine. The panel van is marketed as the iLoad.

In Malaysia, the second generation Hyundai Starex was launched in May 2008 with 11 seats. In August 2009, the Starex was updated and now known as the Hyundai Grand Starex Royale. Updates included a new grille, body-coloured wing mirrors opposed to black, addition of a rear windscreen wiper and a new in-car-entertainment roof-mounted system. In July 2011, the Starex was updated yet again. The changes this time included a revised chrome grille, the addition of LED daytime running lights, side skirting, revised front and back bumpers and a new rear spoiler with built-in stop light. The second row of seats gained swivel functionality, the instrument cluster was revised and electronic stability programme or ESP and a GPS navigation system became standard equipment. This July 2011 update was available with in a sole GLS variant with an optional premium package being available. In March 2014, the Starex in Malaysia received yet another grille update and was now available with two variants: Base and Deluxe. For 2017, the Starex received yet another revised front end which included a revised front grille and front bumper. The update also brought along revised side cladding, gloss back panelling on the rear taillights and revised rear bumper with exhaust cut outs. During the 2018 Kuala Lumpur International Motorshow or KLIMS, the Starex was facelifted. But the facelift consisted only of only a new front end design and was now available with a sole Executive variant. The second generation Hyundai Starex was first launch in Malaysia in May 2008 and subsequently received 5 updates in August 2009, July 2011, March 2014, December 2016 and in November 2018 respectively.

In the Philippines, the Starex is called the Hyundai Grand Starex and was launched in December 2007 and was offered in 3 grades, GL (ten-seater and twelve-seater, both have manual transmissions), GLS (ten-seater, witha five-speed automatic transmission) as well as the top-of-the-line Gold (10-seater). In 2014, Hyundai Philippines released the Grand Starex Platinum as the top grade. It has seen widely varying uses in the country not just as a commuter van; from UV Express, delivery vans, ambulances and even as a funeral hearse.

In Indonesia, the second generation Hyundai Starex is available as the Hyundai H-1, and was introduced in 2008, with three options: GLS, Elegance, and XG. At first, only petrol engines were available for H-1. The diesel engines came in February 2010, when Hyundai decided to produce H-1 in Indonesia for ASEAN market.

In Thailand, the second generation Hyundai Starex is marketed as the Hyundai H-1. It comes in three variants, the Touring, Executive and Deluxe. All come with 12 seats. The Executive and Deluxe were badged as "Maestro" until a minor change in 2011. The facelift H-1 was launch in Thailand in August 2018. In 8 November 2021, the H-1 Elite NS was released and limited to 300 units.

The Grand Starex "VIP" variant is based on H-1. Features include seven seats with second-row "Double VIP" seats that can electrically control seat inclination and leg support and 19-inch TV and DVD player. They are available in late 2010. In late 2012, the Grand Starex "Premium" became available with sliding "Double Super VIP" seats on the second row and a DVD player with a smaller 10.2-inch screen.

Facelift 
Hyundai gave a second facelift to the Grand Starex in South Korea, having new Urban and Limousine models. It has the cascading grille design but has differences on interior design. The standard version uses the same cockpit as the old model while the Urban version has the floating touch display and four-spoke steering wheel like most Hyundai vehicles. Special vehicle options (ambulance, school service, camping) are also revised for the vehicle. For right-hand drive models, only the exterior is updated. The Hyundai Grand Starex was discontinued in South Korea on 18 March 2021, succeeded by the Hyundai Staria.

Awards and accolades 
 Best Large MPV - CIMB Autoworld Car of the Year Awards 2010

References

External links

2000s cars
2010s cars
2020s cars
All-wheel-drive vehicles
Cars introduced in 1997
Commercial vehicles
Hyundai trucks
Starex
Minibuses
Pickup trucks
Rear-wheel-drive vehicles
Vans